The Veterans Memorial Stadium is a sports stadium located in Pago Pago Park, in Pago Pago, American Samoa. The 5,000-capacity venue is one of the smallest stadiums in Oceania, and serves as American Samoa's national stadium. It is currently used mostly for matches in various football codes, such as soccer, rugby league, and the territory's most popular code, American football. 

Football venues in American Samoa
Athletics (track and field) venues in American Samoa
Pago Pago 
National stadiums